Ammannia gracilis is a species of flowering plant in the family Lythraceae. It is native to Africa.

This aquatic plant has a branching, prostrate stem that roots at the nodes. The blunt-tipped, lance-shaped leaves are roughly a centimeter long. The small flowers have four purple petals and either 4 or 8 stamens. The flowers occur in small clusters.

References

gracilis
Aquatic plants